Barbatteiidae is an extinct family of lizards, endemic to the paleoisland Hațeg Island in the Tethys Ocean during the final stages of the Cretaceous, In what is now Romania. It contains two monotypic genera, Barbatteius and Oardasaurus, alongside some indeterminate material. It appears to be closely related to modern teiids and the Early Cretaceous lizard genus Meyasaurus

References 

Late Cretaceous lepidosaurs of Europe
Cretaceous Romania
Fossils of Romania
Prehistoric reptile families